Weng Hao (born 21 March 1998) is a Chinese artistic gymnast. He competed in the 2017 World Artistic Gymnastics Championships in Montreal, Canada, placing 6th in the pommel horse event finals. Over the course of the 2016, 2017, 2018, 2019, and 2020 FIG World Cups he won 5 gold medals in pommel horse: three in Baku and one in Anadia and Cottbus each. At the 2021 World Artistic Gymnastics Championships he qualified for the pommel horse event final and placed second in the final in a tie with Kazuma Kaya.

Competitive history

References 

1998 births
Living people
Chinese male artistic gymnasts
Gymnasts from Anhui
Sportspeople from Anhui
Medalists at the World Artistic Gymnastics Championships
21st-century Chinese people